Sofia Gerhardt (1813-1887), was a Russian businessperson.

She was the founder of the Leningrad Zoo.

References

1813 births
1887 deaths
19th-century businesswomen from the Russian Empire
19th-century businesspeople from the Russian Empire